SM U-1, also known in English as the German Type U 1 submarine, was the first U-boat class of the U-boat series of submarines produced for the German Empire's Imperial German Navy. Only one was built. The U-1 was constructed by Germaniawerft in Kiel and was commissioned on 14 December 1906. When World War I began in 1914, the U-1 was deemed obsolete and was used only for training until 19 February 1919, when it was struck by another vessel while on an exercise.

Design

The SM U-1 was a redesigned Karp class submarine by Austrian born engineer <ref>{{cite web|url=https://www.routeyou.com/es-de/location/view/48858077/submarino-sm-u-1 |title=SM U-1|website=www.routeyou.com|accessdate=30 August 2020|language=es}}</ref> working for the German shipbuilding company Friedrich Krupp Germaniawerft. The main improvements over the export Karp class included trim tanks instead of a moveable weight, a redesigned forecastle to improve seagoing ability, a  larger diameter and strengthened pressure hull which prevented oil leakage from the external tanks, a rearrangement of the internal equipment and a heavier ballast keel.

The Imperial German Navy avoided the use of gasoline due to the perceived risk of fires and explosions that had caused many accidents in early submarines, and instead of the gasoline engines that had powered the Karp boats, U-1 was given much safer Körting kerosene engines. While normally kerosene engines were started using gasoline, the U-1 engines avoided even this and instead used electrically-heated air.

The Körting engines could not be reversed and also had to run at full speed, since their rpm could not be varied to any useful extent, and as a consequence U-1 was fitted with adjustable-pitch propellers to allow her speed to be controlled. These propellers were abandoned in later designs due to their poor efficiency, kerosene-electric propulsion being used instead before diesel propulsion was finally installed in the  class in 1912-1913.

History
Construction on U-1 began in the autumn of 1904. The boat began its trials in August 1906, a year later than originally planned. The total cost amounted to 1,905,000 Mark (equivalent to  €11,620,000 in 2016).
After suffering damage from a collision while on a training exercise in 1919, U-1'' was sold to the Germaniawerft foundation at the Deutsches Museum in Munich where it was restored and can be viewed on display. A large portion of the starboard hull has been removed to allow visitors to see the submarine's interior.

References

Bibliography

External links
 

Type U 1 submarines
U-boats commissioned in 1906
World War I submarines of Germany
Ships preserved in museums
1906 ships
Ships built in Kiel
Museum ships in Germany